The 2018–19 National League season, known as the Vanarama National League for sponsorship reasons, was the fourth season under English football's new title of National League, fifteenth season consisting of three divisions and the fortieth season overall.

National League

The National League consists of 24 clubs.

Promotion and relegation
The following clubs changed divisions after the 2017–18 season:

Despite a 2–1 defeat to Boston United on 21 April 2018, Salford City became 2017–18 National League North champions after Harrogate Town lost 3–1 to Bradford Park Avenue. Havant & Waterlooville were crowned 2017–18 National League South champions on 28 April after a 3–2 victory over Concord Rangers. On 13 May, Harrogate Town were promoted after a 3–0 win against Brackley Town in the 2017–18 National League North playoff final. All three teams played in the National League for the first time in their histories. On the same day as Harrogate's promotion, Braintree Town were also promoted after beating Hampton & Richmond 4–3 on penalties after a 1–1 draw in the 2017–18 National League South playoff final, securing an instant return to the National League.

On 24 April, after 97 years as an EFL club, Chesterfield were relegated to the National League following Morecambe's 0–0 draw against Cambridge United. On 5 May 2018, despite a 3–0 victory against Chesterfield, Barnet became the second club to be relegated from League Two following Morecambe's 0–0 draw against Coventry City, ending their three-year stay in the EFL.

These teams replaced Macclesfield Town, Tranmere Rovers, Chester, Guiseley, Torquay United and Woking. Macclesfield Town were crowned 2017–18 National League champions and promoted to League Two on 21 April after a 2–0 victory over Eastleigh, ending their six-year absence from the EFL. Tranmere Rovers were promoted to League Two on 12 May after a 2–1 victory over Boreham Wood in the playoff final and returned to the EFL after a three-year absence. Boreham Wood and Sutton United were invited to compete in the 2018–19 Scottish Challenge Cup in a new expansion of that competition as the highest-finishing remaining teams in the division.

Chester were the first team to be relegated from National League on 8 April after a 2–0 loss to Tranmere Rovers. Despite staying up on the final day for the past two seasons, it was not to be third time lucky for Guiseley who joined them on 17 April after a 1–0 loss to relegation rivals Barrow. Torquay United became the third team to be relegated from the National league on 21 April after a 1–1 draw with Hartlepool United, confirming the club's first ever relegation to the sixth tier. The fourth and final team to suffer relegation was Woking, who were relegated on 28 April following a 2–1 defeat to Dover Athletic, ending their five-year stay in the National League.

Team changes

To National League
Promoted from 2017–18 National League North
 Salford City
 Harrogate Town

Promoted from 2017–18 National League South
 Havant & Waterlooville
 Braintree Town

Relegated from 2017–18 League Two
 Chesterfield
 Barnet

From National League
Promoted to 2018–19 League Two
 Macclesfield Town
 Tranmere Rovers

Relegated to 2018–19 National League North
 Chester
 Guiseley

Relegated to 2018–19 National League South
 Torquay United
 Woking

Stadiums and locations

Personnel and sponsoring

Managerial changes

League table

Play-offs

Quarter-finals

Semi-finals

Final

Results table

Top scorers

Monthly awards

Each month the Vanarama National League announces their official Player of the Month and Manager of the Month.

Team of the Season
At the end of the season, the National League announced its official team of the season.

National League North

Team changes

To National League North
Promoted from 2017–18 Northern Premier League Premier Division
 Altrincham
 Ashton United

Promoted from 2017–18 Southern League Premier Division
 Hereford

Relegated from 2017–18 National League
 Chester 
 Guiseley

From National League North
Promoted to 2018–19 National League
 Salford City
 Harrogate Town

Relegated to 2018–19 Northern Premier League Premier Division
 Gainsborough Trinity
 North Ferriby United

Relegated to 2018–19 Southern League Premier Division Central
 Tamworth

Stadia and locations

Personnel and sponsoring

League table

Play-offs

Quarter-finals

Semi-finals

Final

Results table

Managerial changes

Top scorers

Monthly awards

Each month the Vanarama National League North announces their official Player of the Month and Manager of the Month.

National League South

The National League South consisted of 22 clubs.

Team changes

To National League South
Promoted from 2017–18 Isthmian League Premier Division
 Billericay Town
 Dulwich Hamlet

Promoted from 2017–18 Southern League Premier Division
 Slough Town

Relegated from 2017–18 National League
 Torquay United
 Woking

From National League South
Promoted to 2018–19 National League
 Havant & Waterlooville
 Braintree Town

Relegated to 2018–19 Isthmian League Premier Division
 Bognor Regis Town
 Whitehawk

Relegated to 2018–19 Southern League Premier Division South
 Poole Town

Stadia and locations

League table

Play-offs

Quarter-final

Semi-finals

Final

Results table

Top scorers

Monthly awards

Each month the Vanarama National League South announces their official Player of the Month and Manager of the Month.

Step 3 Super Playoffs
With the introduction of a new division at Step 3 of the National League System, an altered promotion playoff process was implemented for the 2018–19 season for clubs to reach the National Leagues North and South for the 2019–20 season.

As per prior seasons, 3 teams were relegated each from the North and South leaving 6 vacancies to fill. Each of the winners of the four Step 3 leagues were automatically promoted to the National Leagues North & South for 2019–20. 

The Champions of the Step 3 leagues are: 
 Isthmian League Premier Division: Dorking Wanderers
 Northern Premier League Premier Division: Farsley Celtic
 Southern Premier League Premier Division Central: Kettering Town
 Southern Premier League Premier Division South: Weymouth

Each of the four leagues ran a playoff involving the teams finishing from second to fifth. The winners of these playoffs proceeded to the Super Playoffs.
The playoff winners are:
 Isthmian League Premier Division: Tonbridge Angels
 Northern Premier League Premier Division: Warrington Town
 Southern Premier League Premier Division Central: King's Lynn Town
 Southern Premier League Premier Division South: Metropolitan Police

The winners of the following two fixtures were promoted:

References

 
National League (English football) seasons
5
Eng
Eng